Tamani Hotel Marina (also known as Number One Dubai Marina) is a 55-story hotel in Dubai, United Arab Emirates.

About 

The hotel is a family oriented hotel and is guests drawn from countries such as Kazakhstan and Azerbaijan. The hotel has promoted itself as offering a "Shopping Experience". It increased its guest numbers by 5% between 2012 and 2013.

The hotel is situated directly opposite the Dubai Marina and Yacht Club. The 55-story tower, built in steel and glass, has 245 bedroom apartments. The property is decorated in a contemporary Arabic style. Facilities include outdoor and indoor pools, a gym, and a health club complete with a sauna, spa, and Jacuzzi.

The hotel overlooks Palm Islands and is near Jumeirah Beach.

Awards 

The hotel won a 2013 World Luxury Hotel Award.
The hotel was recognized at MENA (Middle East and North Africa) Travel Awards 2013 with the silver medal.

See also 

List of tallest hotels in the world
List of tallest buildings in Dubai

References

External links
 http://www.tamanimarina.ae

Architecture in Dubai
Hotel buildings completed in 2006
Residential buildings completed in 2006
Residential skyscrapers in Dubai
Skyscraper hotels in Dubai